Walter Lechner (4 August 1949 – 8 December 2020) was an Austrian racing driver and pilot.

Biography
Lechner was the director of the racing team Walter Lechner Racing. His full-time racing career spanned from 1978 to 1996, with an appearance in the 2010 24H Series and two racing in the 2013 International GT Open.

In 1984, he competed in Can-Am with Williams Grand Prix Engineering, Lola Cars, and March Engineering. He finished sixth in the 1986 1000 km of Nürburgring and finished fifth in the 1987 Kyalami 9 Hours. In 1988 and 1989, he participated in the 24 Hours of Le Mans in a Porsche 962.

References

1949 births
2020 deaths
Austrian racing drivers
Formula Super Vee Champions

Formel Super Vau drivers
Walter Lechner Racing drivers
24H Series drivers
International GT Open drivers
24 Hours of Le Mans drivers
Sports car racing team owners